The Capture of Daugavgriva by Swedish forces in July 1608 occurred during the Polish–Swedish War (1600–1611).

Daugavgrīva castle (Polish: Dynemund, Swedish: Dünamünde) was the first objective of the Swedish forces during the campaign of 1608, due to its location near Riga (Daugavgrīva is Riga suburb today), and the fact that it could be used to block that city from the sea. When the Swedes, numbering 8000 troops and led by Joachim Frederick von Mansfeld, approached the fortress at Daugavgrīva, the Polish commander of the 130 strong garrison (with 40 cannons), Franciszek Białłozor, lacking in supplies and little hope of relief, decided to surrender. Swedes captured Daugavgriva on 5 August 1608.

The Poles would not be able to recapture the fortress until more than a year later at the Battle of Daugavgriva (1609).

References

Conflicts in 1608
Daugavgrīva
Daugavgrīva
17th century in Latvia
Daugavgrīva
Daugavgrīva, Capture of